The Late News may refer to:

 The Late News (British TV programme), a defunct British news bulletin programme broadcast on ITV that aired from 2008 to 2009
 The Late News (Hong Kong TV programme), the defunct evening news bulletin programme broadcast on ATV News in Hong Kong

See also
 Late-night news